The Washington Railway and Electric Company (WR&E) was the larger of the two major street railway companies in Washington, D.C., the capital of the United States, until 1933. At that time, it was merged with its main competitor, the Capital Traction Company, to form the Capital Transit Company. The WR&E's core was the Metropolitan Railroad, the second street railway in Washington, which had a main line zigzagging north of Pennsylvania Avenue on streets including F Street North, and it included many other lines in the city and into Maryland suburbs.

History
Congress passed a law incorporating the Metropolitan Railroad on July 1, 1864, two years after the Washington and Georgetown Railroad. The W&G had been assigned a route largely along Pennsylvania Avenue, one of the major diagonal streets in downtown Washington. The Metropolitan's route roughly paralleled this, but was longer, since it had to zigzag on north–south and east–west streets. The route began at the north side of the Capitol, heading northwest on New Jersey Avenue, west on D Street North (and C Street North and Indiana Avenue for eastbound cars), north on Fifth Street West, and west on F Street North to Fourteenth Street West near the White House. Beyond the intersection of F and 14th Streets, the railroad was authorized to continue north on 14th Street to I Street North, turning west to Washington Circle. However, it did not build on I Street, instead turning west off 14th Street onto H Street North to 17th Street West, part of a route - the rest of which was not built - that continued east on H Street and Massachusetts Avenue and south on New Jersey Avenue. The same law authorized a north–south line on Ninth Street West between B Street North and M Street North, among other streets.

An amendment, approved March 3, 1865, allowed certain branches and extensions, including among them a branch from D Street North south on Fourth Street West to Fort McNair (then the Arsenal), and an extension from New Jersey Avenue and A Street North east on A Street, south on First Street East, and east on East Capitol Street to Ninth Street East. However, instead of building on Fourth Street north to D Street, the company turned the line northwest on Missouri Avenue, north on Sixth Street West, and west on B Street North to reach the south end of the Ninth Street branch. This was not authorized by any laws, but several company officers were on the city Board of Public Works, which did not object.

North American Company
North American Company began to acquire stock in the WR&E in 1922, gaining a controlling interest by 1928. North American had once been one of the original stocks in the Dow Jones Industrial Average.

On December 1, 1933, the WR&E, Capital Traction, and Washington Rapid Transit merged to form the Capital Transit Company. The WR&E continued as a holding company, owning 50% of Capital Transit and 100% of the Potomac Electric Power Co., but Capital Traction was dissolved.

By December 31, 1933, North American Company owned 50.016% of the voting stock of WR&E. North American also tried to purchase Capital Traction, but never owned more than 2.5% of Capital Traction stock. But for the first time street railways in Washington were under the management of one company.

Capital Transit made several changes. As part of the merger, the Capital Traction generating plant in Georgetown was closed (and in 1943 decommissioned) and Capital Transit used only conventionally supplied electric power. In 1935 it closed several lines and replaced them with bus service. Because the Rockville line in Maryland was one of the lines that was closed, a new terminal, the "Capital Transit Community Terminal," opened at Wisconsin Avenue NW and Western Avenue NW on August 4, 1935.

The WR&E remained under the ownership of North American Company for the next decade, as a major subsidiary holding company of other lines.

By 1940, North American had become a US$2.3 billion holding company heading up a pyramid of by then 80 companies. It controlled ten major direct subsidiaries in eight of which it owned at least 79%. The WR&E was by then one of the three major holding companies among the ten direct subsidiaries.

North American Company was broken up by the Securities and Exchange Commission, following the United States Supreme Court decision of April 1, 1946.

Lines

F Street Line

Ninth Street Line
The line was extended north from Rhode Island Avenue to Seventh Street West and Florida Avenue in 1873.

Connecticut Avenue Line
The Washington Rapid Transit Co., although owned by the North American Co., was not merged into Capital Transit until 1936.

References

Companies established in 1864
1933 disestablishments in Washington, D.C.
Street railways in Washington, D.C.
Defunct Washington, D.C., railroads
Defunct public transport operators in the United States
Defunct Maryland railroads
Interurban railways in Washington, D.C.
Interurban railways in Maryland
1864 establishments in Washington, D.C.